Il padre di famiglia (internationally released as The Head of the Family) is a 1967 Italian-French international co-production comedy film directed by Nanni Loy. For his performance in this film and in Italian Secret Service, Nino Manfredi was awarded with a Golden Plate at the 1968 Edition of the Italian Academy Awards known as David di Donatello.

Totò died two days after having filmed his first scene in the film; he was replaced by Ugo Tognazzi. Later Tognazzi was nominated at the Italian Film Press Awards, the Nastro d'Argento for Best Supporting Actor.

Story
The story centres on two characters, a man and a woman, both architects, who meet some time after WWII and get married. Though deeply in love they come from different backgrounds, and do not share the same outlooks on life. Soon she becomes fascinated with her husband's progressive socialist ideals. After the wedding she abandons her work to dedicate herself to raising their growing family, and he, feeling abandoned by her, begins an amorous relationship with one of his colleagues.

Following the various dramas of bringing up the children, who are schooled with the Montessori method, the wife goes to a clinic to recover from a nervous breakdown, while he, still in love with his wife, returns to his own family. When he's asked by a Census official, who is the Head of the Family, the husband does not know what to reply.

Despite the title, in reality, the film narrates the story of women's lives in this period of the late 1960s. At this time, irrespective of social class and culture, women were obligated to live a submissive life and sacrifice much to raise their families. In reality, in this film it is the woman who is the Head of the Family.  Leslie Caron has often referred to this film in interviews as one of her favourites in all her work.

Cast 
Nino Manfredi: Marco
Leslie Caron: Paola
Ugo Tognazzi: Romeo
Claudine Auger: Adriana
Mario Carotenuto: Paola's father
Sergio Tofano
Gino Pernice
Raoul Grassilli
Paolo Bonacelli

References

External links

1967 films
Commedia all'italiana
Films directed by Nanni Loy
Films scored by Carlo Rustichelli
Films with screenplays by Ruggero Maccari
1967 comedy films
Allied Artists films
1960s Italian-language films
1960s Italian films